Patrice Beaumelle (born 24 April 1978) is a French football coach and former player and the current head coach of MC Alger. For most of his career he worked with compatriot Hervé Renard as Renard's assistant.

Career
In 2010, Beaumelle was an assistant to Renard for the Angola national team., and in 2011 he also was assistant to Renard at Algerian club USM Alger.

Beaumelle also had previously been the assistant manager to Renard at Zambian national team from 2011. After Renard left his post in 2013 to take charge of FC Sochaux, Beaumelle was appointed as his successor. Following Herve Renard's appointment as manager of the Ivory Coast on 31 July 2014, Beaumelle handed in his resignation to the Football Association of Zambia, and joined Ivory Coast as Renard's assistant.

In November 2020, Patrice Beaumelle was reappointed at the head of the Ivorian football selection.

Managerial

References

1978 births
Living people
French sports coaches
French footballers
Association football defenders
French football managers
Zambia national football team managers
Ivory Coast national football team managers